The Hooligans in Wondaland Tour was a concert tour that was headlined by American singer-songwriter Bruno Mars and Janelle Monáe to support Mars' and Monáe's 2010 debut studio albums, Doo-Wops & Hooligans and The ArchAndroid, respectively. The co-headlining concerts were announced in February 2011; it coincided with their performances at the 53rd Annual Grammy Awards. In April 2011, a promotional trailer was released through Mars's YouTube channel and a dedicated website, which was designed to further promote the tour. The concerts took place in North America in May and June of that year.

Mars declined several invitations to open shows for other artists because performing in small, intimate venues, would allow him to build a fan base. Mars's set list for the tour included songs from Doo-Wops & Hooligans, and some covers while Monáe's set list included songs from The ArchAndroid, one song from her debut EP Metropolis: The Chase Suite (2007), and two covers. The Hooligans in Wondaland Tour received positive reviews from most critics, who praised Mars's and Monáe's performances, and said they, along with Mayer Hawthorne, are providers "of perfect pop music". The co-headlined tour was named by NME as one of the best 25.

Background and development
On February 15, 2011, after Bruno Mars and Janelle Monáe performed at the 53rd Annual Grammy Awards, a joint co-headlining tour for both artists entitled "Hooligans in Wondaland" was announced. The concert tour was performed in North America in throughout May and June 2011. Pre-sales tickets were made available two days after the announcement of the tour; they were sold as bundles that included a meet-and-greet with one of the artists, a signed poster, a digital EP, and a commemorative laminate. On February 26, 2011, tickets were made available to the general public. A promotional trailer was released through Mars's YouTube channel, as well as a dedicated website to promote the tour.

The tour was named Hooligans in Wondaland Tour, after both Mars's debut studio album Doo-Wops & Hooligans (2010), Monáe's Atlanta crew Wondaland Arts Society, and a track included on her debut studio album The ArchAndroid (2010). The tour's promotional poster was inspired by the artwork of  "James Brown-era all-star shows at the Apollo Theater". In 2011, Mars rejected several requests to open shows for other artists and instead decided to co-headline a tour with Monáe. The show was produced by AEG. This strategy meant lower earnings in the short term but allowed Mars to build a fan base by performing shows at small, intimate venues. After the first show of the Hooligans in Wondaland Tour, Mars said he was nervous about the "production values" of the lights and other equipment.

Sound
During the Hooligans in Wondaland concerts, Mars's and Monáe's engineers shared the consoles, and technician Ben Rothstein handled the sound gear. In addition, Derek Brener, Mars's front of house (FOH) engineer, controlled several inputs and outputs, including the Stereo Auxiliary Output for the subwoofers. Brener also controlled the distressors on Mars's vocals and bass. Hall Verb was employed for drums and horns, delay and R-Verb for vocals, and compression of the guitar's sound. Mars had two pairs of speaker wedges downstage center; the inner pair was mixed with his voice and two background vocals while the outer pair had the band mix along with his guitar on top, according to Mars's monitor engineer Mike Graham. Alex McCloud, Monáe's monitor engineer, said her setup was very close to that used by Mars but Monáe had a wedge mix and sidefill speakers in front. Reggie Griffith, Monáe's FOH assistant, was in charge of the singer's vocals, removing some of the pitch when she leaned into the microphone. Griffith and Nate "Rocket" Wonder were responsible for mixing Monáe's tracks.

Concert synopsis
The concerts were supported by Mayer Hawthorne & The County, American musician Patrick Stump and English rapper Plan B. Hawthorne used his opening spot to play a range of material, including some of his famous covers. Monáe performed the concerts in a "The Cotton Club" set, along with her 13-piece orchestra, the ArchOrchestra. She was dressed in a white shirt, black tie, tuxedo pants and a cloak covering it, while her hair was arranged in a pompadour. The ArchOrchestra included three violinists, a cellist, and two horn players; the musicians wore white and black 1960's modernist-style clothing. Mars, who used a Gibson guitar during the concerts, performed with his band the Hooligans. During the Hooligans in Wondaland Tour, Mars usually wore a fedora hat, a "plaid flannel-turned-vest" or a sleeveless denim jacket over a tee-shirt—sometimes with a Harley-Davidson design—and black jeans. The stage had square screens projecting images, lights, and flashing graphic colors and video. Mars's set lasted around an hour.

Monáe 
The show started with an MC wearing a top hat and coat-tails. Monáe was taken to stage by several dancers wearing hooded black cloaks, which were later removed and the dancers instead wore "skintight bodysuits with glittering cuffs". At the same time, the ArchOrchestra played "space-funk" as a James Bond and Fantasia fusion appeared on the screens. Monáe usually opened with the instrumental of "Suite II Overture". Once on stage, she performed "Dance or Die" and "Faster", alternating between rapping and gospel chanting. Monáe also sang "Locked Inside". She created a "theatrical flair", fending off masked dancers. Afterwards, Monáe put on sunglasses and performed "Sincerely, Jane" as well as a cover of The Jackson 5's "I Want You Back" while moonwalking.

Monáe then turned her back to the audience, and painted on a canvas the word "love" in yellow letters and a female figure as she sang "Mushrooms & Roses". Under dimmed lights, Monáe, accompanied by a guitarist, performed Charlie Chaplin's ballad "Smile", after which she started a "pouding", "toe-tapping" performance of "Cold War" and the "funk jam" "Tightrope". During the performance of "Cold War", images of Mohammed Ali "bobbing and weaving", and Darth Vader with Luke Skywalker battling using lightsabers were displayed. She closed her set with a rock gospel version of "Come Alive (The War of the Roses)", before diving into the crowd, getting a "piggy-back ride" over fans or taking a "victory lap". While Monáe performed "Tightrope", strobe lights flashed and the discordant mixture of sounds was turned "to a whisper". Monáe and her band laid down on the floor and then emerged from it "back to a full-blooded finish". Both songs were sung in a crescendo. As Monáe talked and wailed, her hair released itself from its pompadour, and her performance reached a climax.

Mars
Before Mars started his show, he asked the crowd to put away their mobile phones. He began by performing the "feel-good" theme "Top of The World", which was inspired by Michael Jackson's song "Wanna Be Startin' Somethin'". The third song on the setlist was a rock cover of "Money (That's What I Want)" by Barrett Strong, which served as an interlude before the reggae influences on Travie McCoy and Mars's featured single, "Billionaire", a song with which the audience joined in at many performances. The performance of "Billionaire", which was shorter than the original song, had Mars singing the verses "I'll freak you right, I will" to the sound of Aaliyah's "Are You That Somebody." He performed "Our First Time" in a sensual way with reggae vibes influenced by jazz.  The song was followed by the uptempo "Runaway Baby", which was filled with "retro rock 'n' roll". Before Mars sang a doo-wop harmony with three members of his band, he told the audience, "This is the kind of music I love". He then sang the romantic, the Beach Boys-influenced anthem "Marry You".

"Marry You" was followed by "The Lazy Song", one of the highlights of the tour; Mars's performance included a comedic moment in which his backup singer shouted, "Oh my God, that feels great!" and the band stopped to "goof". The performance also included a repetition of the verse "have some nice sex". "Count on Me", an "ode to buddydom", was performed as a singalong in which Mars played a ukulele. An extended version of "Liquor Store Blues" was included in the set. Mars would serenade a woman in the audience with his chorus on B.o.B's "Nothin' on You", as a portion of "Have You Seen Her" by the Chi-Lites "emerged". He returned to the stage and sang "Grenade" as a powerful rock song that was inspired by the Cure's "Just Like Heaven". The show's closing number "Just the Way You Are" was performed with a different melody; Mars asked the "men in the audience to give their ladies attention", sometimes choosing a woman from the crowd and singing to her. For some concerts, the encore was "Somewhere in Brooklyn", which had the word "Brooklyn" replaced with the name of the city in which he was performing. Mars closed the show with the emotional ballad "Talking to the Moon", which was inspired by the "70s soft-rock" of the Carpenters and Chicago.

Critical reception
The Hooligans in Wondaland concerts were met with mostly positive reviews. Chris Gray, writing for Houston Press, praised Mars's and Monáe's performances, saying the show was "assembled so perfectly, delivered so charismatically and received so warmly". Gray concluded, "finding fault ... would be like throwing rocks at the Easter Bunny". Jordan Levin from the Miami Herald complimented the show, saying Mars and Monáe are "moving musical formulas forward, not with technology and spectacle, but with invention and talent". Robert Ham of The Oregonian said Mars had the spectators' attention throughout the concert and that he sang every note himself; Ham also praised Mars's guitar skills and dubbed Monáe's performance "exhilarating". LA Weeklys Lainna Fader lauded the performances and commented, "With the addition of Mayer Hawthorne, you've got three of the truest purveyors of perfect pop music on stage together.""

Matthew Kivel of Variety praised Mars and Monáe's performance by saying that "Mars is impressive, his vocal gifts allowing him to infuse heavy doses of emotion and subtle improvisations into his song's", while Monáe "brought a refreshingly unpredictable approach to her stage show", showing "the up-and-comer as a talent with seemingly unlimited potential." Angel Cheung and Alexis Greskiw from The Vancouver Observer praised the show, saying, "Monáe and Mars were the perfect combination, filled with vivacity and soul."" Shawn White, for Westword said the Hooligans in Wondaland Tour "might look like a strange bill" but "all three featured acts are purveyors of perfect pop music". Seattle Gay Newss Shaun Knittel commended the live show, saying, "Bruno Mars and Janelle Monáe are as good as critics say they are." Reed Fischer, for New Times Broward-Palm Beach, affirmed that Mars's show "exceeded" his "expectations immensely".

In a mixed review, Billboard Leila Cobo affirmed that Mars "comes across like the real thing, like few acts today do." Cobo dubbed Monáe's show as "impressive", but that she was missing "some of Mars' nuance". Emily Barker of The Globe and Mail called Mars's set "obvious and pedestrian; so cynical and exploitative" but praised Monáe's performance, saying, "she proved herself miraculous, an unabashedly theatrical musical polyglot". The Hollywood Reporters Lauren Schutte criticized the high cost of the ticket due to the "short running time" but noted everyone "looked more than satisfied".

NMEs Emily Barker compiled a list of the 25 best co-headlined shows as of 2013, on which she ranked the Hooligans in Wondaland Tour at number 20. Barker said the show "took its cues from the old-school".

Set lists
Mars and Monáe's set lists given below were performed on May 18, 2011, respectively. The list evolved over the course of the tour, and sometimes included other numbers. Mars included "Please Say You Want Me" by The Schoolboys, the Cleftones' "You Belong to Me" and a portion of "Somewhere in Brooklyn" along with "Talking to the Moon" as an encore, with the word "Brooklyn" replaced with the name of the city in which he was performing. Monáe included "America the Beautiful", "Say You'll Go" and "Wondaland".

"The Other Side"
"Top of The World"
"Money (That's What I Want)" / "Billionaire"
"Our First Time"
"Runaway Baby"
Doo Wop (interlude)
"Marry You"
"The Lazy Song"
"Count on Me"
"Liquor Store Blues"
"Nothin' on You"
"Grenade" 
Encore
"Just the Way You Are"

"Dance or Die"
"Faster"
"Locked Inside" 
"Smile" (Charlie Chaplin cover)
"Sincerely, Jane" 
"I Want You Back" (The Jackson 5 cover)
"Mushrooms & Roses"
"Cold War"
"Tightrope"
"Come Alive (The War of the Roses)"

Shows

Box office score data

Personnel
Credits adapted from several sources.

The Hooligans
 Bruno Mars – vocals
 Philip Lawrence – backup vocals 
 Phredley Brown – keyboard
 Jamareo Artis – bass guitar 
 Eric Hernandez – drums 
 Kameron Whalum – trombone 
 Dwayne Dugger –  saxophone 
 James King – trumpet
 Kenji Chan – lead guitar

Management
 Shaun Hoffman – tour manager
 Randy Phillips – chief of concert promoter, for AEG (2011 Hooligans in Wondaland tour)
 Brandon Creed – personnel management, for Creed Company

Production
 Cory FitzGerald – lighting designer
 LeRoy Bennett – lighting designer
 Derek Brener – FOH for Mars
 Mike Graham –  monitors for Mars
 Reggie Griffith – FOH assistant for Monáe, mixing 
 Alex McCloud – monitors for Monáe
 Nate "Rocket" Wonder – mixing for Monáe
 Ben Rothstein – Clair systems technician
 James Berry – monitor engineer

Notes

References

2011 concert tours
Bruno Mars concert tours
Concert tours of Canada
Concert tours of North America
Concert tours of the United States
Co-headlining concert tours